Craig Wright may refer to:
 Craig Wright (cricketer) (born 1974), Scottish cricketer
 Craig Wright (playwright) (born 1965), American playwright, television writer, and producer
 Craig M. Wright (born 1944), Henry L. and Lucy G. Moses Professor of Music at Yale University
 Craig R. Wright (20th Century), American baseball writer and proponent of sabermetrics
 Craig Steven Wright (born 1970), Australian computer scientist, cryptocurrency investor and businessman

See also
 J. Craig Wright (1929–2010), American lawyer and judge, justice of the Ohio Supreme Court